Atik Jauhari (born 14 August 1949 in Tangerang in Indonesia) is a badminton coach from Indonesia.

Biography

1974 - 1999 Indonesia National Badminton Association (PBSI)

Senior National Coach. Senior coach for 7-time Thomas Cup Winner Men’s Singles Talent Scout & Coach: Liem Swie King (World Champion, etc.), Icuk Sugiarto (World Champion, etc.), Hastomo Arbi, Eddy Kurniawan, Hermawan Susanto, Ardy Wiranata, Alan Budikusuma, Fung Permadi, etc.
Men’s Double Coach: Tjun Tjun/Johan Wahjudi (6 times All England Champion, etc.), Bobby Ertanto,/Hadibowo, Imay Hendra/Bagus Setiadi, Eddy Hartono/Gunawan, Ricky Subagja/Rexy Mainaky (World Champion & Olympic Champion, etc.), Antonius/Denny Kantono, Candra Wijaya/Sigit Budiarto (World Champion, etc.), Tony Gunawan/Halim Haryanto (World Champion, etc.), Candra Wijaya/Tony Gunawan (World & Olympic Champion, etc.), etc.

1999 - 2003, Swedish Badminton Federation (SBF)

Senior National Coach. Coached the Swedish Team to reach the final round of Thomas Cup and Uber Cup In Malaysia, 2000.
Coach for Par Gunnar Jonsson/Peter Axelsson as Runner-Up in European Championship in Scotland .
Coach for Marina Andrievskaja as Runner-Up in European Championship in Scotland
Head Coach. 3-time Winner of Swedish National Championship (team match)
3-time Runner-up of European Championship (team match)

2006-2008, Thailand badminton Association

National Coach, in result had Boonsak Ponsana as A Winner beating world #1 Lin Dan and runner up Mixed double in Aviva Open Singapore Super Series 2007.

2009-2010

Head National Coach for the Indian badminton Association (BAI) and has booked the record and brought India as the Finalist in the Commonwealth Games 2010 and Saina Nehwal became Women's #1 rank in the world

2010- present

Owner of the Atik Jauhari Badminton School (Sekolah Badminton Atik Jauhari). focused on talented youth Badminton Athletes and also open classes for professionals and groups.

2010-2012
The Indian National Badminton team  Coach, with the result of:
1. Saina Nehwal becoming the first Indian player who won the World Cup
2. Indian becoming the winner of the Commonwealth games

2012- 2013
Italian Badminton National team coach

Honors
 Indonesian Best Coach, voted by readers of Bola Magazine, Indonesia (year 1994, 1996, 1997)
 Indonesian Best Coach, voted by The Indonesian Journalist Association, Indonesia (year 1994 and 1996)
 Satya Karya Bhakti, honorary medal from the Indonesian Sports Committee (1996)
 Adhi Manggala Krida, honorary medal for Lifetime Achievement from the President of the Republic of Indonesia (1997)
 Satyalancana Kebudayaan, honorary medal for Lifetime Achievement from the President of the Republic of Indonesia (1998)

Personal life
Atik Jauhari is married to Neng Titi and has 4 children (Lanny, Aji, Hanny, Annas) and 3 Grand children named Adrianna, Abigail, Danny, and Dika.

Achievements

International Open Tournaments 
Men's doubles

References

Times of India

Badminton in Indonesia
Badminton in India
1949 births
Living people
Badminton coaches